The Academy of Canadian Cinema and Television presents an annual award for Best Achievement in Music: Original Song to the best original song in a  Canadian motion picture.

First presented at the 3rd Genie Awards in 1982, the award was presented as part of the Genie Awards until 2011. Since 2012, it has been presented as part of the Canadian Screen Awards.

1980s

1990s

2000s

2010s

2020s

See also
 Prix Iris for Best Original Music

References

 
Film awards for Best Song
Original song